Hyloxalus cepedai is a species of frog in the family Dendrobatidae. It is endemic to Colombia where it is known only from its type locality near Villavicencio in the Cordillera Oriental. There is very little information on its biology.

References

cepedai
Amphibians of Colombia
Endemic fauna of Colombia
Taxonomy articles created by Polbot
Amphibians described in 2000